Sahoday Sr. Sec. School is a private school in Safdarjung Development Area, Hauz Khas, New Delhi, India. It was founded by Archbishop Rt. Rev. Angelo Fernandes.

The school enrolls children from kindergarten to high school and is affiliated with the Central Board of Secondary Education in India. The medium of instruction is English, and the Hindi and Sanskrit languages are mandatory.

The School motto is "Rising Together", which speaks about raising children from each section of the society and giving education to all.

History

Sahoday School opened in 1976, and it is a minority school which belongs to the Catholic Archdiocese of Delhi. It is a religious, social and educational institution, which undertakes different programs for the development of the whole person. The school has been recognized by the Directorate of Education and is affiliated with the Central Board of Secondary Education.

Society

At present the President of the Society is Most Rev. Dr. Anil J.T. Couto, the Chairman –cum-Vicar General is Very Rev. Fr. Susai Sebastian, the Director for Education is Rev. Fr. Vincent D'souza, the Manager of the school is Rev. Fr. James Peter Raj, and the Principal is Sr. Joyce. In total, there are 1901 students and 76 staff (both teaching and non-teaching) on roll. The teachers try their level best to mold the students through various inter-school & extra curricular activities.

Infrastructure
The Infrastructure in Sahday school consists of a spacious assembly ground, and an extensive football and cricket ground. It has spacious well-furnished classrooms with cross ventilation. The knowledge resource Centre (Library) is well furnished and spacious with latest editions and all variety of books. It offers a balanced curriculum that constitutes total teaching learning programs composed of overall aim, syllabus materials, methods and assessments. It stimulates the child's creativity, talents, and potent in non-academic fields. It provides punishment and stress-free environment to the beloved children.

The school consists of the following:

 Well furnished classrooms with Extra marks Smart learning board
 Computer labs
 Science laboratories
 Dance room
 Math's park
 Sports room
 English language labs
 Auditorium

Houses
Houses are named after well-known Indian Freedom fighters and scientist who established their name with the golden letters in history of the world.
  GANDHI HOUSE 
  NEHRU HOUSE
 BHAGAT HOUSE 
 RAMAN HOUSE

Student Council
A student government system operates at sections of Class 6th and 12th. It is called the Student Council and has 20-30 members. Its function is to collaborate with the administration to organize everyday activities of the school and ensure discipline. The members of the school cabinet are interviewed and selected by the senior teachers along with the activity in-charge and the Principal. They participate in the formal ceremony of Investiture. The School council is Headed by The Head Boy and The Head Girl who in collaboration with others look into the everyday functioning of the school.

Apart from them, the school council also has Vice captains of every house and club. Class representatives also help the functioning of the school Cabinet.

Subjects
The following subjects are offered in the school:

 English
 Biology
 Physics
 Chemistry
 Mathematics
 Computer science 
 Economics
 Physical education
 Business studies
 Accountancy
 Political science
 History
 Geography
 Hindi
 Sanskrit
 Environmental studies
 Mental Maths

Co-curricular activities

 Dance
 Yoga
 Vocal music (Indian and Western)
 Arts and crafts
 Table tennis
 Computer club
 Volleyball
 Instrumental music
 Dance drama
 English Literary club
 Science club
 Football
 Throw ball
 Maths club
 Cultural club				
 Basketball
 Eco-friendly Club

See also
CBSE
Education in Delhi
Education in India
List of schools in Delhi

References

External links

1976 establishments in Delhi
Schools in Delhi